Tarabuco  Municipality is the first municipal section of the Yamparáez Province in the Chuquisaca Department, Bolivia. Its seat is Tarabuco. Its population is overwhelmingly indigenous: of 10,530 people 15 or older in the 2001 Census, 9,834 (or 93,40%) self-identified with an indigenous people; 9,779 to the Quechua people, 29 Aymara, 15 to another indigenous people, and 7 as Guaraní. On 6 December 2009, its residents voted in favor of indigenous autonomy for the municipality, with a vote of 90.8%.

References

Municipalities of Chuquisaca Department